Arthur "Candy" Evans (18 November 1903 – 7 January 1952) was a Welsh boxer, dual-code international rugby union, and professional rugby league footballer who played in the 1920s and 1930s.

Background
Candy Evans' birth was registered in Abersychan district, Wales, he was a coal miner, on his retirement from boxing and rugby he became a professional gambler, facing substantial debts, he committed suicide aged 48 in Abersychan, Wales.

Playing career

International honours
Candy Evans won caps for Wales (RU) while at Pontypool RFC in the 1924 Five Nations Championship against England, Ireland, and France, and won 4 caps for Wales (RL) in 1928–1933 while at Halifax, Leeds, Castleford in the 19–23 defeat by England at Fartown Ground, Huddersfield on Wednesday 18 March 1931, and Warrington.

County honours
Candy Evans won caps playing left-, i.e. number 11 for Glamorgan County RLFC while at Castleford in the 19–12 victory over Cumberland at Recreation Ground, Whitehaven on Saturday 21 March 1931, and 12–33 defeat by Yorkshire at Thrum Hall, Halifax on Wednesday 15 April 1931.

Challenge Cup Final appearances
Candy Evans played in Warrington's 17-21 defeat by Huddersfield in the 1933 Challenge Cup Final during the 1932–33 season at Wembley Stadium, London, in front of a crowd of 41,784.

Boxing career
Candy Evans was also a boxer, one year going straight from a Welsh rugby union international against Ireland to compete in, and win, the Welsh amateur boxing championship hours later. He later became a professional boxer, though remained better known for his rugby achievements.

References

External links
(archived by web.archive.org) Statistics at boxrec.com
Statistics at wolvesplayers.thisiswarrington.co.uk

1903 births
1952 deaths
1952 suicides
Castleford Tigers players
Dual-code rugby internationals
Halifax R.L.F.C. players
Leeds Rhinos players
Leigh Leopards players
Pontypool RFC players
Rugby league hookers
Rugby league players from Torfaen
Rugby league second-rows
Rugby union locks
Rugby union players from Abersychan
Suicides in Wales
Wales international rugby union players
Wales national rugby league team players
Warrington Wolves players
Welsh male boxers
Welsh miners
Welsh rugby league players
Welsh rugby union players
Welsh gamblers